Group 1 may refer to:
 Alkali metal, a chemical element classification for Alkali metal
 Group 1 (racing), a historic (until 1981) classification for Touring car racing, applied to standard touring cars. Comparable to modern FIA Group N
 Group One Thoroughbred horse races, the leading events in the sport
 Group 1 Automotive, a publicly traded car dealership group in the United States
 Group 1 Rugby League, a Rugby League Competition in New South Wales, Australia
 Fax Group 1 & Group 2 are obsolete analog standards for sending faxes
  Group 1 Software, a former  mail, messaging, and document management provider company, acquired by Pitney Bowes in 2004